For robot control, Stochastic roadmap simulation is inspired by probabilistic roadmap methods (PRM) developed for robot motion planning. 

The main idea of these methods is to capture the connectivity of a geometrically complex high-dimensional space by constructing a graph of local paths connecting points randomly sampled from that space. A roadmap G = (V,E) is a directed graph. Each vertex v is a randomly sampled conformation in C. Each (directed) edge from vertex vi to vertex vj carries a weight Pij , which represents the probability that the molecule will move to conformation vj , given that it is currently at vi. The probability Pij is 0 if there is no edge from vi to vj. Otherwise, it depends on the energy difference between conformations. 

Stochastic roadmap simulation is used to explore the kinetics of molecular motion by simultaneously examining multiple pathways in the roadmap. Ensemble properties of molecular motion (e.g., probability of folding (PFold), escape time in ligand-protein binding) is computed efficiently and accurately with stochastic roadmap simulation. PFold values are computed using the first step analysis of Markov chain theory.

See also
Jean-Claude Latombe
Mark Overmars

References

Robot control
Stochastic simulation